Christian J. Ward (born September 9, 1985), professionally known as Hitmaka, is an American record producer and former rapper from Chicago, Illinois.
Ward began his career as a rapper under the name Yung Berg, having released his debut album Look What You Made Me in 2007. In his later career, he has become better known as a high-profile record producer and executive in the music industry. In 2020, he was appointed as the vice president of A&R at Atlantic Records.

Initially signed to DMX's Bloodline Records as Iceberg, he ultimately signed to Epic Records. Ward's major-label debut single was "Sexy Lady", and was released in April 2007, and became the lead single for his debut studio album Look What You Made Me (2008). As a recording artist he’s known for the singles "Sexy Lady", "Sexy Can I" (with Ray J) and "The Business".

Career

2001–2005: Career beginnings
In 2001, Ward signed to rapper DMX's Bloodline Records. He made his debut on the Exit Wounds soundtrack on the song "Dog 4 Life" as Iceberg. However, his parents sent him to a military boarding school in Montana in 2001. He moved to Los Angeles after finishing school in 2003. In 2005, Ward worked as a hype man and recording assistant for Disturbing tha Peace member and Chicago rapper Shawnna.

2007–present

Ward's debut single, "Sexy Lady", which featured R&B singer Junior, became a hit on Los Angeles urban radio, and he signed with Epic Records among many labels that approached him. Ward's six-track EP Almost Famous: The Sexy Lady EP was released in July 2007. Also in 2007, Ward made a cameo in the music video of singer Kat DeLuna's debut single "Whine Up". "Sexy Lady" peaked at #18 on the Billboard 100. In addition to that single, Ward recorded a song with Lil Wayne and Brisco titled “Bitch Please” which was released in November 2007.

In December 2007, Ward released another single "Sexy Can I", a collaboration with singer Ray J, then his debut album Look What You Made Me. The second single was "Do That There", featuring Dude 'n' Nem, followed by "The Business", featuring Casha, which peaked at #33 on the Hot 100. Look What You Made Me would chart at #20 on the Billboard 200 and at #2 on the Top Rap Albums chart. In December 2008, Ward began casting "exceptionally stand out beautiful dark skin/brown skin women to showcase beauty of all races" for a potential dating reality show that he would host.
However, as evidenced by the trailer for his new TV show, titled Back In Business, it will not be a dating show. But the reality show was never released as planned. In 2009, Ward formed The Dream Team production group with his older brother K-Young and producer Rob Holladay. In 2012, Ward also co-wrote and co-produced for Nicki Minaj's album The Pinkprint on the tracks "Want Some More", "Buy a Heart" and "Shanghai".

In 2014, Ward would appear in the first season of the VH1 show Love & Hip Hop: Hollywood. The show loosely follows events in his and fellow castmate, Hazel E's personal lives. On November 9, 2014 it was announced by VH1 that they had fired Ward from Love & Hip Hop: Hollywood due to arrest for allegedly assaulting his fellow castmate and girlfriend Masika Kalysha Tucker.

In 2020, Ward helmed the executive-producer duties for rapper T.I.'s new album The L.I.B.R.A..

Legal issues
In October 2015, Ward was cited $100,000 in back child support for his child with Brandy Flint. In December 2017, Ward was considered a delinquent parent by the Illinois Department of Healthcare and Family Services, which has published information on Yung Berg's failure to pay child support. At the time, Ward's amount owed in past-due child support is $104,962 for one child.

Personal life

Robbery victim
On August 23, 2008, it was reported and confirmed that Ward had been ambushed by Detroit, Michigan, rapper Trick Trick and his entourage in his club and had his signature "Transformers chain" taken. But on August 26, 2008, Trick Trick denied having anything to do with the altercation, and claimed to have saved Ward from the altercation. On December 16, 2011, Ward explained the altercation by stating he didn't want to go to Trick Trick's club since a member of his entourage had a problem with him, but somehow ended up there. "I was like 30 deep, I went in the club and I went to the back because I had the number one record at the time", he said, stating that he wanted a free bottle. "The co-owner come back and he said, My partner Trick Trick said ain’t no love for you on those bottles. I was like, your partner? Hold on. So now we’re in Trick Trick's club, I come to find out, the same club that I didn’t wanna go to and perform. Now, I’m in the club. I’m like 5’6, 150 pounds. I come out there and the whole club security surrounds me. They whooped my ass through the club, the security. My entourage was all around us and they were getting their asses whooped too!"
On October 5, 2010, United Kingdom rapper Rowdy T announced that he had taken Ward's "Batman chain" and called him a snitch for reporting it to police. But during an interview Ward announced that he had done no such thing and the chain wasn't anything important to him.

On March 20, 2011, during an interview Ward announced that he was done with wearing flashy jewelry stating,

Controversies

Bow Wow
On March 25, 2008, Ward released his single entitled "Do That There", which was a direct diss towards fellow rapper, Bow Wow. However, during an interview in early 2009, Ward stated that the two had settled their differences.

Brisco
On March 7, 2008, Ward insulted Miami rapper Brisco on a video podcast. On July 10, 2008, Ward became involved in a controversy with rapper Flo Rida when speaking about his upcoming album Look What You Made Me when he stated "my album got pushed back like Flo Rida's hairline", though he later apologized for his remark stating he was just playing. Flo Rida's Poe Boy Entertainment label mate and longtime friend Brisco took offense to the remark stating "You talking too much, Imma beat yo lil red ass".

Teairra Marí
On February 21, 2012 during an interview, singer Teairra Marí stated that she did not like Ward and would get him ambushed again due to comments he made about her during one of his interviews. On May 10, 2012, Ward spoke about the situation stating "On the Teairra situation, first and foremost, I did the interview with The Breakfast Club in 2011, and I left that in 2011," he said in an interview. "After I did the interview, I called Ray J and I said, 'Yo, this is what I talked about in my interview,' because I spoke candidly about our relationship and I felt my loyalty is to Ray, it's not nowhere near to Teairra. I don't even know her like that, and at the end of the day, why are we gonna go back and forth about how you tried to holla at me...you know what you did...I've got bigger things to worry about than being trivial over some pussy, especially when there's so much pussy out there. I've been called worse by better people than her". In 2014, during the first season of the VH1 show Love & Hip Hop: Hollywood, it was revealed that Ward and Marí had resolved their former issues towards each other. Later in the season, he produced her song "Deserve".

Discography

 Look What You Made Me (2008)
 Mr Ward The Album  (2011)
 Reality Check (2012)
 YFM The Genesis  (2015)
 1-800-HIT-EAZY(with Eric Bellinger) (2021)
 Big Tuh (2021)
 1-800 Hit Eazy 2 (Eric Bellinger )
 Tink Pillow Talk (2022) (Hosted By HitMaka)
 Thanks 4 Nothing Tink (Hosted By HitMaka) (2023)

Filmography

Television

References

External links

Yung Berg on Myspace

1986 births
African-American male rappers
African-American record producers
American hip hop record producers
Chicago Vocational High School alumni
MNRK Music Group artists
Epic Records artists
Living people
Rappers from Chicago
Songwriters from Illinois
Participants in American reality television series
21st-century American rappers
Record producers from Illinois
21st-century American male musicians
American music industry executives
Midwest hip hop musicians
African-American songwriters
21st-century African-American musicians
20th-century African-American people
American male songwriters